Acinetobacter larvae is a Gram-positive, aerobic, non-spore-forming, coccobacilli-shaped and non-motile bacterium from the genus of Acinetobacter which has been isolated from the gut of a larval from the insect Omphisa fuscidentalis.

References

External links
Type strain of Acinetobacter larvae at BacDive -  the Bacterial Diversity Metadatabase

Moraxellaceae
Bacteria described in 2017